The 21st Division was one of the divisions of the Spanish Republican Army that were organized during the Spanish Civil War on the basis of the Mixed Brigades. Situated on the Andalusian front, the division played a minor role.

History 
The unit was created on April 3, 1937, within the Army of the South. The 21st Division was born from the militarization of the old Granada sector. It was made up of 76th, 79th and 80th mixed brigades, with its headquarters in Jaén. As of June 1937, the division was integrated into the IX Army Corps.

Command 
 Commanders
 Antonio Gómez de Salazar;
 Martín Calvo Calvo;
 Carlos Cuerda Gutiérrez;
 Luis Bárzana Bárzana;
 Eloy Marín Villanueva;

 Commissars
 Rafael Bonilla Pérez, of the CNT;

 Chiefs of Staff
 José Mondéjar Gil de Pareja;
 José Rodríguez;

Order of battle

Notes

References

Bibliography
 
 
 
 
 
 

Military units and formations established in 1937
Military units and formations disestablished in 1939
Divisions of Spain
Military units and formations of the Spanish Civil War
Military history of Spain
Armed Forces of the Second Spanish Republic